Alberto "Berto" González García (born 2 April 1998), formerly known as Bertín, is a Spanish footballer who plays for AD Alcorcón as a left winger.

Club career
Born in Avilés, Asturias, González finished his formation with Sporting de Gijón, after a short stint at Real Avilés. He made his senior debut with the reserves on 23 April 2017, coming on as a second-half substitute for Isma Cerro in a 2–0 Tercera División home win against CD Llanes.

González scored his first senior goal on 20 August 2017, netting the game's only in a home defeat of Gernika Club, and he extended his contract with the club on 9 October. On 1 September 2019, he scored a brace in a 5–0 home routing of UD San Sebastián de los Reyes.

On 3 November 2019, González scored a hat-trick for the B's in a 4–2 home defeat of Real Madrid Castilla. He made his first team debut late in the month, replacing Aitor García in a 0–0 away draw against CD Mirandés in the Segunda División championship.

On 7 July 2022, free agent González signed a contract with Primera Federación side AD Alcorcón.

References

External links

1998 births
Living people
People from Avilés
Spanish footballers
Footballers from Asturias
Association football wingers
Segunda División players
Segunda División B players
Tercera División players
Sporting de Gijón B players
Sporting de Gijón players
AD Alcorcón footballers